Riki Kimura is a Singaporean footballer currently playing as a goalkeeper for Balestier Khalsa FC.

Club career
Kimura made his professional debut against Geylang International in 2019.

Other career
Along with several friends, Ilhan Fandi, Danial Scott Crichton, Haziq Alaba and Rasaq Akeem open an online shop selling clothing.

Career statistics

Club

Notes

References

Singaporean footballers
Singaporean people of Japanese descent
Warriors FC players
Living people
Association football goalkeepers
2000 births